Brave Yester Days is a two-disc best-of album by Katatonia. It contains the material from Katatonia's older era, mainly consisting of death/doom material, and a few alternative rock songs.

"Black Erotica" is an earlier version of "12" from Brave Murder Day and "Untrue" is a previously unreleased song from the Sounds of Decay sessions.

Reception 
Eduardo Rivadavia from AllMusic said that the compilation displays "Katatonia's gradual shift away from their doom/death origins" to a sound featuring "lighter guitars, incremental keyboards, and the replacement of deathly growls with clean-sung, melodic vocals" and called the album "an astoundingly well-conceived summary of Katatonia's purely metallic career" and "a frankly unbeatable bang-for-buck proposition when it comes to housing so many scattered releases under one roof."

Track listing

Credits 
Katatonia
 Lord Seth (on Jhva Elohim Meth) / Lord J. Renkse (on Dance of December Souls) (Jonas Renkse) – drums, clean vocals, lyrics & screaming
 Blackheim (Anders Nyström) – lead guitar, music, guitar (on Jhva Elohim Meth & Dance of December Souls), bass (on Jhva Elohim Meth & Brave Murder Day) & backing vocals (on For Funerals to Come...)
 Day Disyhrah (Dan Swanö) – backing & clean vocals (on Jhva Elohim Meth & Dance of December Souls), electric keyboard & session musician
 Israphel Wing (Guillaume Le Huche) – bass (on Dance of December Souls, For Funerals to Come... & "Scarlet Heavens")
 Fredrik Norrman – music (on Brave Murder Day, Sounds of Decay & Saw You Drown) & rhythm guitar
 Mikael Åkerfeldt – death grunts & session musician

References 

2004 greatest hits albums
Katatonia albums